Make Me Believe is a music album of Pinoy Pop Superstar 2006 1st runner up and GMA Network talent Aicelle Santos. It was released under GMA Records and released 2 successful singles "Ikaw Pa Rin" and "Make Me Believe".

Track Listing (Title [Length] - Artist / Lyricist / Composer / Arranger)
 Ikaw Pa Rin (Video)
 Lyrics & Music by: Janno Gibbs / Arranged by: Marvin Querido
 Lullabies
 Lyrics & Music by: Francis Salazar / Arranged by: Albert Tamayo
 Make Me Believe (Video)
 Lyrics & Music by: Francis Salazar / Arranged by: Melvin Morallos
 All Gone (My Lingering's Over)
 Lyrics by: Aicelle Santos / Music by: Ryan Padecio & Mike Delos Reyes / Arranged by: Marvin Querido
 A House Is Not A Home
 Lyrics by: Hal David / Music by: Burt Bacharach / Arranged by: Marvin Querido
 Nasaan
 Lyrics & Music by: Vehnee Saturno / Arranged by: Marc Santos
 Give Me One More Reason
 Lyrics & Music by: Vehnee Saturno / Arranged by: Jun Tamayo
 Tunay Bang Iibigin
 Lyrics by: Aicelle Santos / Music by: Ryan Padecio, Redj Saguin, & Mike Delos Reyes / Arranged by: Jun Tamayo
 Kung Bakit Ngayon
 Lyrics & Music by: Vehnee Saturno / Arranged by: Marc Santos
 All The Man That I Need
 Lyrics by: Dean Pitchford / Music by: Michael Gore
 Maghihintay
 Lyrics & Music by: Tata Betita

Singles Released

See also
GMA Network

References

2005 debut albums
GMA Music albums